Tauno Ilmari Vartia (2 June 1907, in Sääksmäki – 8 February 1977) was a Finnish agronomist, farmer and politician. He was a member of the Parliament of Finland from 1966 to 1975, representing the National Coalition Party.

References

1907 births
1977 deaths
People from Valkeakoski
People from Häme Province (Grand Duchy of Finland)
National Coalition Party politicians
Members of the Parliament of Finland (1966–70)
Members of the Parliament of Finland (1970–72)
Members of the Parliament of Finland (1972–75)